Peter McDonald (born 1973) is a  Japanese/English artist who won the 2008 John Moores Painting Prize.

Life and career
McDonald was born in Tokyo, Japan and studied at St. Martins School of Art. He lives and works in London and Tokyo. His brother Roger McDonald is the director of Arts Initiative Tokyo. His father, originally from north London, migrated to Japan in the 50s. His mother is from east Tokyo.

McDonald was awarded the 2008 John Moores Painting Prize for the canvas "Fontana", receiving a bequest of £25,000. The painting refers to the work and practice of the Italian painter Lucio Fontana, who was infamous for slashing and puncturing his paintings. McDonald's painting pictures an artist at work at the easel but has real holes in the surface of the painting. The painting was chosen from 3,222 entries, shortlisted to 40 works which were judged by Sacha Craddock, Jake and Dinos Chapman, Paul Morrison and Graham Crowley.

Exhibitions

2009 Art on the Underground, public commission for Southwark Station, London Underground
2008 Peter McDonald, Gallery Side 2, Tokyo
2008 John Moores Contemporary Painting Prize, Walker Art Gallery, Liverpool
2008 Imaginary Realities: Constructed Worlds in Abstract and Figurative Painting, Max Wigram Gallery, London
2007 Peter McDonald, Kate MacGarry, London
2007 Like Color in Pictures, Aspen Art Museum, Colorado
2007 Mutineer, Kunsthalle M8, Berlin
2006 The Wonderful Fund, Pallant House Gallery, Chichester
2006 Group show, Hiroshima Museum of Contemporary Art, Japan
2006 Group show, Galleri Charlotte Lund, Stockholm, Sweden
2006 Peter McDonald, Gallery Side 2, Tokyo
2005 Peter McDonald, Kate MacGarry, London
2005 Makeover, Paintings by Seven Pacific Rim Artists,
2005 Govett-Brewster Art Gallery, New Plymouth, New Zealand
2005 Rough Diamond, Program, London
2004 Painting, Kate MacGarry, London
2003 Peter McDonald, Keith Talent Gallery, London
2003 East International, Norwich Gallery, UK
2003 Bad Touch, Keith Talent Gallery
2003 Moving Collection, Govett-Brewster Art Gallery, New Zealand
2003 Good Bad Taste, Keith Talent Gallery
2002 Peter McDonald, Gallery Side 2, Tokyo, Japan
2001 Table Manners, Mizuma Gallery, Tokyo
2000 Crossed Purposes, Mafuji Gallery, London

References

External links
 Peter McDonald at Kate MacGarry, London
 John Moores 25 at the Walker Art Gallery, Liverpool

Japanese painters
21st-century British painters
British male painters
Living people
1973 births
21st-century British male artists